Pela or Bola (autonym: ,), is a Burmish language of Western Yunnan, China. In China, Pela speakers are classified as part of the Jingpo ethnic group. Pela may also be spoken in Burma.

Distribution
There are about 500 speakers as of 2005. The ethnic population is distributed as follows.

Mangshi
Santaishan (三台山乡)
Yinqian (引欠村)
Kongjiazhai (孔家寨, representative dialect;)
Wuchalu (五岔路乡)
Mengguang (勐广村)
Nongnong (弄弄村)
Gongqiu (贡丘)
Xishan (西山乡)
2nd cluster (二组), Banzai (板栽)
Chengjiao (城郊)
Huashulin (桦树林)
Lianghe County
Bangwai (邦外)
Longchuan County
Shuangwopu (双窝铺)
Wangzishu (王子树)
Palangnong (帕浪弄)

Yinqian (引欠, or Yunqian 允欠) and Mengguang (勐广) have the largest Pela populations.

References

Further reading

External links 
 ELAR archive of Documentation of Pela

Burmish languages
Definitely endangered languages
Languages of China